Neapolitan Mystery is a 1979 Italian mystery film directed by Sergio Corbucci. The film is also known as Atrocious Tales of Love and Death.

Cast
 Marcello Mastroianni as Raffaele Capece
 Ornella Muti as Lucia Navarro
 Renato Pozzetto as Police Inspector
 Michel Piccoli as Conductor Navarro
 Zeudi Araya as Elizabeth
 Capucine as Sister Angela
 Peppino De Filippo as Raffaele's father
 Elena Fiore as Filomena
 Peppe Barra as Giardino (as Giuseppe Barra)
 Ennio Antonelli
 Armando Curcio
 Nicola Di Gioia as Prostituta
 Salvatore Furnari
 Franco Iavarone
 Giovanni Imparato
 Gennarino Palumbo
 Franca Scagnetti
 Carlo Taranto
 Natale Tulli
 Tomas Arana as Husband (uncredited)

References

External links

1979 films
1970s mystery films
1970s Italian-language films
Films set in Naples
Films directed by Sergio Corbucci
Giallo films
Commedia all'italiana
Films scored by Riz Ortolani
Italian films about revenge
1970s Italian films